In perennial philosophy, tradition means divinely ordained truths or principles that have been communicated to humanity as well as an entire cosmic sector through various figures such as messengers, prophets, avataras, the Logos, or other transmitting agencies. According to this perspective, tradition does not refer to custom, habit, or inherited ways of thinking and living. Contrarily, it has a divine foundation and involves the transmission of the sacred message down through the ages. Used in this sense, tradition is synonymous with revelation, and it encompasses all forms of philosophy, art, and culture that are influenced by it. 

Traditionalists assert that there is also a Primordial Tradition, which serves as the archetype of all traditions. 

Tradition has exoteric and esoteric dimensions. The exoteric aspects of a tradition are primarily represented by its ceremonies, rituals, and rules, whereas the esoteric aspects are concerned with its spiritual and intellectual qualities. Traditionalists often compare the term "tradition" to the term "modern" or "modernity". While "traditional" refers to something that has a "Transcendent Origin," "modern" is equivalent  with "secular", and signifies that which is disconnected from the Transcendent.

Although the term was first used in relation to perennial philosophy by René Guénon, and was further developed by his followers, including Ananda Coomaraswamy and Frithjof Schuon, it was most notably conceptualized by the Iranian philosopher Seyyed Hossein Nasr, who cited Guénon as an influence on his concept of tradition.

Etymology
The word "tradition" is derived from the Latin term traditio, which means "to hand over." Etymologically, the term tradition refers to the transmission of knowledge, practice, skills, laws, forms, and a variety of other oral and written aspects. For Nasr, tradition is analogous to a "living presence" that leaves its imprint but is irreducible to that imprint. There are at least two levels of meaning here. First, tradition is defined as the passing down of knowledge from one generation to the next, which is reflected in the word's Latin etymology. Nasr considers the Arabic din and Sanskrit dharma to be roughly similar in meaning 'tradition,' while he recognizes that they do not correspond with the Latin root, which indicates the concept of transmission. Second, tradition entails some kind of "living force", and the mark it leaves behind, with the force "ontologically transcending the mark". This resembles to a Platonic form whose appearance in the universe is only a shadow of its "true reality", but Nasr has spoken of something "living" and "present", which is a recurring theme in his works.

Concept
According to Beverly J. Lanzetta, "tradition forms the backbone" of perennial philosophy. The term "tradition," as used by Nasr and other "traditionists," such as Rene Guenon, Frithjof Schuon, Titus Burckhardt, and Martin Lings, does not refer to custom, habit, or inherited patterns of life and thought. On the contrary, tradition "is of sacred and divine origin", and it encompasses the continuation and transmission of the sacred message through time. Used in this context, "tradition" refers to revelation and all forms of philosophy, art, and culture that are shaped by it, spreading the reverberations of revelation on earth and thereby reminding humans of the "Divine Center" and "Ultimate Origin".

For Nasr, "tradition":

Tradition, according to Nasr, is pure and divine, and it represents God's will. Similarly, tradition, as a sacred concept with its origins in God, is the only way to communicate with God, who fully encompasses the universe and is constantly present "in the very depth of all human beings". As a result, tradition is perfectly in harmony with the prophetic revelations, which represent the "highest order of reality", capable of elevating man to "higher altitudes of personality". 

The traditionalist thinkers use the word to refer to "both the Sacred as revealed to man through revelation and the unfolding and development of the sacred message in the history of the particular humanity for which it was destined", in a way that represents both horizontal and vertical continuity with "the Origin", tying every moment of the concerned tradition's life "to the meta-historical Transcendental Reality".

Exoteric and esoteric dimensions
For Traditionalists, Tradition has two fundamental aspects, namely, exoteric and esoteric. Exoteric aspect is predominantly manifested in its rites, rituals, and laws. It also comprises the theologies or doctrines that give a tradition its uniqueness and particularity. The esoteric or the inward dimension of tradition, on the other hand, encompasses "not only its spiritual substance, but also its intellectual qualities". Islam, for example, divides its esoteric and exoteric aspects into the Shariah and Tariqa, respectively. The Kabbalah is considered esoteric in Judaism as opposed to the exoteric understanding of the Talmud. The esoteric aspect of tradition is considered its essence and its core. This aspect, it is claimed, is only accessible "to those who are able to appreciate the inward dimension of tradition".

The Primordial Tradition 
Together with various traditions and religions, Traditionalists also believe in the reality of the Primordial Tradition, which is said to encapsulate "all truths of all religions". For Guenon, the Primordial Tradition represents "the unity of thought and action which, transcending the arbitrary rule of culture and society, serves as the one common denominator between men and leads them to an awareness of Unity, supreme and indivisible". For Nasr, this Primordial Tradition "flows from an Absolute Truth that has been expressed in diverse ways through the ages". Nasr holds that the existence of different religions is not evidence against the Primordial Tradition. The assumption that all religions hold a fundamental truth, contrarily, is supported by such variation when one approaches religions from an esoteric viewpoint. According to Nasr:

 

For Nasr, "each tradition is based on a direct message from Heaven and cannot be seen simply as the historical continuation of the Primordial Tradition". Its acceptance does not imply that any of the revealed religions are devoid of divine origin. Rather, it is to affirm the "presence" that is inextricably linked to the sacred. Nasr finds similarities between the concept of the Primordial Tradition and the Islamic understanding of al-din al-hanif, the faith of the prophet Abraham. The Primordial Tradition is thus viewed as "a block of principles which were often revitalised through revelation". For him, all religions are united not just by a common source but also by a common substance, the Primordial Tradition.

History
According to Damian Howard, one of the major challenges of Traditionalist philosophy was defining the term "tradition" in order to claim an underlying unity while explaining away the wide variety of all those civilizations and forms.

René Guénon
Rene Guénon, the founder of the traditionalist school, believed in the existence of a "Primordial Tradition", which "was revealed to humanity at the beginning of the present cycle of time, but was partially lost". According to William W. Quinn, Guenon employed the term Primordial Tradition "almost interchangeably with sophia and philosophia perennis". He associated tradition with "civilization," but he did not include Western modernity in his definition. He also emphasizes the contrasts between two types of traditions: religious and metaphysical. Religion requires the involvement of an element taken from the sentimental order, whereas the metaphysical point of view is solely intellectual. Religion, Guénon claims, is only "an epithet" for Judaism, Christianity, and Islam, and it includes the sub-disciplines of theology and mysticism.

Ananda Coomaraswamy
According to William W. Quinn, Coomaraswamy's idea of Tradition is similar to Guénon's Primordial Tradition. Coomaraswamy saw no difference between the concepts of Tradition and philosophia perennis. For Coomaraswamy, their application differed, with philosophia perennis being used to represent a collection of interconnected metaphysical principles that could be explained either without reference to any particular Traditional culture or with reference to all of them, while the term Tradition was almost always used in relation to a specific culture.

Frithjof Schuon
Frithjof Schuon understood tradition "as being the semidivine and semihuman reality that provides mankind with a general climate conducive to the consciousness of the Absolute". The word tradition appears in Schuon's writings frequently, usually in close proximity to the word religion. Following in Guenon's footsteps, Schuon theorized the causes of the historical origins of a wide spectrum of religious traditions. For him, religions differ because human societies and cultures differ, and God's revealed truth adjusts to local situations in this way. According to Howard, Schuon's view of cultures echoes cultural views of Renan and other race-based theories of the nineteenth and early twentieth centuries. He assigns essentially distinct traits to the chief racial kinds into which he divides mankind, with these differences in mentality necessitating the heterogeneity of religious forms. However, racial diversity for Schuon is not an arbitrary phenomenon. To comprehend the significance of races, one must first recognize that they are derived from essential qualities of mankind rather than anything accidental in nature. It is not only a question of a Platonic form being instantiated in the cosmos in such a way that it bears "the traces of its contingent insertion point" (i.e. one or other specific culture) but also of allowing for the possibility "that even the highest and most general point of the form could also be very different from one tradition to another", because racial differences relate to fundamental aspects of the constitutional formation of humanity.

For Howard, Schuon "struggles to make sense of all this" and ends up avoiding the issue by postulating the existence of a "human margin" in religion, a space removed from immediate divine intervention in which human speculation takes inspiration from revelation based on the nature of the particular human beings engaged in their real context. This is how religions lawfully generate concepts and teachings that appear to contradict one another. A notable example is the Christian and Muslim viewpoints on Christ's death.

Seyyed Hossein Nasr
According to Howard, Tradition was finally to be defined by Seyyed Hossein Nasr, whose writings provided a comprehensive framework. Nasr credits Guénon from whom he derives his idea of Tradition. For Nasr, Tradition comes from the divine source and affects all aspects of a society's life. This divine source "is both the content and the means of revelation", which is "effected" by various "transmitting agencies". The revelation's guiding principles gave rise to a number of subsidiary sciences and arts, which were creatively enlarged to incorporate different elements of social, political, and cultural life. For Nasr, tradition is a repository of "Supreme Knowledge", which is another name for the philosophia perennis. It provides humanity with "the means" for attaining supreme knowledge and spirituality.

Tradition and modernity

Nasr and other "traditionists" refer to "tradition" as a reality that is as old as man himself. He believes that the contemporary usage of the term and references to the concept of tradition are, in some ways, an aberration necessitated by the anomaly that is the modern world as a whole. The purpose of using the term is therefore to raise consciousness of the underlying differences between reality represented by this specific sense of the term "tradition" and everything that lacks a divine origin but arises from the merely human and, at times, the subhuman.

If "traditional" refers to something that is still connected to its "transcendent origin" and can be traced back to it, "modern" is identical with "secular," and refers to that which is detached from the "Transcendent", from the immutable principles that govern everything in reality. Modernism and modernity are thus the polar opposites of tradition, implying everything that is essentially human and, progressively, subhuman, as well as everything that is detached and disconnected from the Divine Source.

See also
 Scientia sacra
 Resacralization of knowledge

References

Sources

Further reading
 
 
 
 
  

Philosophy of religion
Perennial philosophy
Traditionalist School
Esotericism
20th-century philosophy
Seyyed Hossein Nasr